Charlene Barshefsky (born August 11, 1950) served as United States Trade Representative, the country's top trade negotiator, from 1997 to 2001. She was the Deputy U.S. Trade Representative from 1993 to 1997. She is a partner at the law firm of Wilmer Cutler Pickering Hale and Dorr. She is also an advisor at Moelis & Company.

Early life, education, and career
Barshefsky was raised in a Jewish family on the North Side of Chicago, to Gustave, a Polish immigrant and chemical engineer, who died in 1995, and Miriam, (who died in 2011) a Russian immigrant and retired substitute teacher. She has one brother, Alvin Barshefsky, and one sister, Annette Weinshank. In 1968, Barshefsky graduated from Von Steuben High School. In 1972, Barshefsky graduated from the University of Wisconsin–Madison with a bachelor's degree, double majoring in English and political science. In 1975, she earned her J.D. from the Columbus School of Law of The Catholic University of America.

Barshefsky was nominated by former President Bill Clinton to serve as Deputy U.S. Trade Representative along with Rufus Yerxa and Richard W. Fisher. In 1999 she was the primary negotiator with China's Zhu Rongji, laying out the terms for China's eventual entry into the World Trade Organization in December 2001. Her negotiations have been analyzed in Harvard Business School case studies.

Legal practice
As of June 2012, Barshefsky is a senior international partner at WilmerHale. Her legal practice focuses on international business transactions, commercial agreements, and regulatory impediments to exporting and investment. Specifically, her expertise lies in "crafting market penetration strategies for goods, services, and investment and devising practical solutions to market access barriers". Her clients include Fortune 100 and other multinational companies that services like trade litigation, dispute resolution, and government relations strategies. She also advises foreign corporations on commercial and regulatory issues in the United States.

Barshefsky has written and lectured extensively on both U.S. and foreign trade laws and public procurement regimes. She was a partner at the law firm of Steptoe & Johnson. She previously served as vice chair of the International Law Section of the American Bar Association as well as a member of its governing council and chair of its Publications Committee.

Personal life
Outside of her legal practice, Ambassador Barshefsky participates in several professional organizations; she is a board member of the America-China Society, a fellow of the Foreign Policy Association, and a member of the American Academy of Diplomacy and the Trilateral Commission. She also serves on the boards of Intel, American Express, Estée Lauder Companies, and the Howard Hughes Medical Institute. She is a member of the Council on Foreign Relations. She also sits on the advisory board for America Abroad Media.

Barshefsky lives in Washington, D.C. with her husband.

Honors and awards
 Named one of "The Decade's Most Influential Lawyers" (40 lawyers total) by The National Law Journal in the regulatory category.
 Included in BusinessWeek'''s list of "Top Female Corporate Directors"
 Named one of "50 Most Influential Women Lawyers in America" by The National Law Journal in 2007
 Lifetime Achievement Award from Chambers & Partners in 2007
 "Top Lawyers in Washington, D.C." in international trade by the Washingtonianmagazine for 2007, 2009, and 2011
 Outstanding Achievement award at the Euromoney'' Legal Media Group's "America's Women in Business Law Awards"

References

External links 
 Ambassador Charlene Barshefsky's WilmerHale biography
 United States to Resume Bilateral Investment Treaty Negotiations on the Basis of a Revised Model Treaty, 15 May 2012, WilmerHale Publications
 The Copenhagen Climate Change Agreement: Failure or Success? Next Steps and Key Considerations for Business, 21 December 2009, WilmerHale Publications

1950 births
American people of Polish-Jewish descent
American people of Russian-Jewish descent
American women in business
American women lawyers
American lawyers
Clinton administration cabinet members
Columbus School of Law alumni
Jewish American members of the Cabinet of the United States
Living people
United States Trade Representatives
University of Wisconsin–Madison College of Letters and Science alumni
Wilmer Cutler Pickering Hale and Dorr partners
Women members of the Cabinet of the United States
21st-century American women